WCAT (1390 AM) was a commercial radio station licensed to Burlington, Vermont, United States, and serving the Burlington-Plattsburgh area. The station was last owned by Radio Broadcasting Services, Inc., part of the Champlain Media Group. It aired a mainstream rock radio format, simulcast on co-owned 103.3 FM WWMP in Waterbury.

According to FCC records, WCAT's 445-foot tower #1 is the tallest man-made structure in the State of Vermont. WCAT broadcast at 5,000 watts around the clock, with a non-directional signal by day. But to protect other stations on AM 1390 at night when AM radio waves travel farther, it used a directional antenna after sunset. WCAT's transmitter was located off Intervale Road in Burlington. Studios and offices were on Water Tower Circle in Colchester, Vermont.

WCAT also aired on an FM translator, W252CJ, at 98.3 MHz, to give listeners the option to hear the station in FM stereo.

History
The station first signed on as WDOT on April 19, 1954, on the AM 1400 frequency at 1,000 watts of power. WDOT was Burlington's top-40 radio station for years and also an affiliate of the ABC Contemporary Radio Network. The station later moved to its current frequency,  AM 1390, and was allowed to broadcast with 5,000 watts of power both daytime and nighttime. The station used a three-tower directional antenna at night to protect 1390 co-channels in Syracuse, New York (WFBL), Presque Isle, Maine (WEGP), and Plymouth, Massachusetts (WPLM).

The station changed its call sign to WKDR on June 1, 1993. The WKDR calls originated on the AM 1070 frequency, licensed to Plattsburgh, New York (which now operates as WJMP), and the move benefited WKDR, since its previous position operates only in the daytime, protecting the former 50,000-watt clear channel (1-B) station, CBA in Moncton, New Brunswick.

The station changed its call letters to WVAA on September 24, 2002, and to WCAT on August 21, 2006.

WCAT, as a sports radio station, switched affiliations from ESPN Radio to Fox Sports Radio on January 1, 2011. The ESPN affiliation has moved to FM 101.3 WCPV. Through much of 2011, WCAT broadcast a sports talk format simulcast with sister stations WRSA (1420 AM) and WFAD (1490 AM) as "Fox Sports Vermont." By the end of the year, it had switched to an oldies music format simulcast with co-owned WIFY in Addison as "Cruisin' 93.7."

On September 1, 2014, WCAT (with sister station WRSA) dropped the simulcast with WIFY and switched to a comedy radio format. The two stations returned to oldies in July 2015. In early January 2017, WCAT and WRSA both went dark. The oldies format relocated to AM 1070 WPLB, which several months earlier had been sold by WCAT owner Northeast Broadcasting.

On January 9, 2017, WCAT returned to the air, launching a business news format, also heard on FM translator 98.3 and co-owned 1420 WRSA.

WCAT's license was surrendered on November 1, 2022.

Translator
WCAT programming was broadcast on the following translator:

References

External links
VAB Website
WCAT Radio Tower
FCC Station Search Details for DWCAT (Facilty ID: 73613)
FCC History Cards for WCAT (covering 1953-1981 as WDOT) 

CAT
Radio stations established in 1954
Radio stations disestablished in 2022
1954 establishments in Vermont
2022 disestablishments in Vermont
Defunct radio stations in the United States
CAT